Leonid Ivanovich Zhabotinsky (28 January 1938 – 14 January 2016) was a Soviet and Ukrainian weightlifter who set 19 world records in the superheavyweight class, and won gold medals at the 1964 and 1968 Olympic Games.

Early life
Zhabotinsky was born in a village in Uspenka, Sumy Oblast, Ukrainian SSR into a Cossack family. Although Ivan Filippovich, his father, was an athlete, Zhabotinsky stated in a 1967 interview that he took after one of his grandfathers, and neither of his parents had an outstanding physique. Zhabotinsky spent his childhood years in Zaporizhzhia. After graduating from the seven-year secondary school, he worked at the Kharkiv Tractor Plant and was coached by Mikhail Svetlichny at the local weightlifting club of the Armed Forces sports society.

Weightlifting career
Zhabotinsky debuted at the Ukrainian SSR Championship in 1957, where he earned a bronze medal. Later that year, Zhabotinsky entered the Kharkiv Pedagogical Institute and studied there until 1964. Zhabotinsky was the flag bearer for the Soviet Union during the opening ceremonies of the 1968 Summer Olympics in Mexico City, carrying the Soviet flag single-handed when the team marched in, when all the other flag bearers used two hands. Between 1963 and 1974 Zhabotinsky set 19 world records in the superheavyweight class and won gold medals at the 1964 and 1968 Olympics. He was a member of the Communist Party of the Soviet Union between 1965 and 1991.

Personal life
In 1964 Zhabotinsky graduated from the Kharkiv Pedagogical Institute and in 1970 defended a PhD in pedagogy. After ending his sport career he coached weightlifters at the Soviet Army and retired in 1991 as a colonel. In 1987–1991 he worked in Madagascar as a military consultant and weightlifting coach. After that he became a pro-rector of the Moscow Institute of Business and Law, one of the first private higher education facilities in Russia.

Zhabotinsky was married to Raisa and had two sons, Ruslan and Vilen, both of whom have competed in weightlifting. He died at the age of 77 on 14 January 2016 in Zaporizhzhia, Ukraine.

Zhabotinsky was Arnold Schwarzenegger's teenage idol.

References

External links 

 Biography and photo 
 Leonid holding the flag

1938 births
2016 deaths
Communist Party of the Soviet Union members
Honoured Masters of Sport of the USSR
Recipients of the Medal of Zhukov
Recipients of the Order of Merit (Ukraine), 2nd class
Recipients of the Order of Merit (Ukraine), 3rd class
Recipients of the Order of the Red Banner of Labour
Soviet colonels
Soviet male weightlifters
Ukrainian Cossacks
Ukrainian male weightlifters
Olympic weightlifters of the Soviet Union
Weightlifters at the 1964 Summer Olympics
Weightlifters at the 1968 Summer Olympics
Olympic gold medalists for the Soviet Union
Armed Forces sports society athletes
Olympic medalists in weightlifting
Medalists at the 1964 Summer Olympics
Medalists at the 1968 Summer Olympics
European Weightlifting Championships medalists
World Weightlifting Championships medalists
Sportspeople from Sumy Oblast